Joseph Harold McCartney was a poet born in Santa Cruz, California on December 16, 1943 into a family of poor Irish immigrants. He was the fourth of seven children, all of whom were boys. He grew up working part-time in a vineyard to help pay for his brother's way through college. He did not attend school past grade 10 and planned to pick grapes for the rest of his life.

However, when he started writing poetry at age thirteen, in 1961, published his first collection of poetry, titled An Ode to Railway Workers, at age eighteen. This publication sold only a few hundred copies; nonetheless, Joseph continued to write. He also started to draw, sometimes of the characters in his poems, and his artwork has come to supersede some of his early poetry.

Joseph continued to write and draw, publishing Four Backwards Men in a Coffee Mug (1968), the epic two-part Anteater's Paradise (1976), and the critically acclaimed  The Anatomy of a Wallflower (1979).

However, after his father's death in 1982, Joseph went into seclusion and ceased from writing or drawing. Despair continued as he was soon diagnosed with Shruff's Disease at forty-two, an incurable nerve disorder that breaks down nerve tissue and sends its victim to an early grave.

Shaken by this tragic turn of events, Joseph lived out his final years in a state of insomnia and paranoia, and doctors declared him mentally insane two years before he died. Upon his death, Joseph uttered his final remarks: "The world is a bastard."
 
The McCartney Association for Shruff's Disease Victims (MASDV) was established in 1997 to offer hope for those with the disorder. It is still in operation to this day and has raised $4.4 million for its cause.

Joseph's work

An Ode to Railway Workers (1961)
Four Backwards Men in a Coffee Mug (1968)
Anteater's Paradise: Part I (1976)
Anteater's Paradise: Part II (1976)
The Anatomy of a Wallflower (1979)

See also 
Joseph McCarthy

References

1943 births
1995 deaths
20th-century American poets